Ried im Oberinntal is a municipality in the district of Landeck in the Austrian state of Tyrol located 12 km south of the city of Landeck and 3 km below Prutz. It was first mentioned in documents in the 12th century. Tourism is the main source of income.

References

Populated places on the Inn (river)
Cities and towns in Landeck District